Manuel Martí (1663–1737) was a Spanish archaeologist, humanist, writer, and  Hellenist.

Works

Alluvione Tyberis Sylva, Rome, 1688.
Notae in Theocritum.
Satyromastix.
Apasterosis, Madrid, 1722.
Libri Epistolarum duodecim, Madrid, 1735, second edition, Amsterdam, 1738.
Pro crepitu ventris, Madrid, 1737.

1663 births
1737 deaths
18th-century Spanish archaeologists
17th-century Latin-language writers
18th-century Latin-language writers